We Come in Pieces is the second live DVD by the alternative rock band Placebo. It was announced on 24 August 2011 and released on 31 October 2011. It was recorded during a Placebo concert in Brixton Academy, London, on 28 September 2010, the final show of the Battle for the Sun Tour. The live performance includes 20 songs, 15 of which were exclusive to that DVD.

The release has DVD, 2-disc deluxe, and Blu-ray editions. The deluxe and Blu-ray editions include a documentary film on the band's 2009–2010 tour.

Track listing
"Nancy Boy"
"Ashtray Heart"
"Battle for the Sun"
"Soulmates"
"Kitty Litter"
"Every You Every Me"
"Special Needs"
"Breathe Underwater"
"The Never-Ending Why"
"Bright Lights"
"Meds"
"Teenage Angst"
"All Apologies" (Nirvana cover)
"For What It's Worth"
"Song to Say Goodbye"
"The Bitter End"
"Trigger Happy Hands"
"Post Blue"
"Infra-Red"
"Taste in Men"

Personnel
Brian Molko – guitars, vocals
Stefan Olsdal – bass, guitars, backing vocals
Steve Forrest – drums, percussion, backing vocals
Bill Lloyd – bass, keyboards
Fiona Brice – violin, keyboards, theremin, percussion, backing vocals
Nick Gavrilovic – guitars, keyboards, backing vocals

References

External links
Amazon product page

Placebo (band) video albums
Live video albums
2011 video albums
2011 live albums